The rufous-webbed bush tyrant (Cnemarchus rufipennis) is a species of bird in the family Tyrannidae. It is found mostly in Argentina, Bolivia, and Peru with a few records in Chile, where its natural habitats are subtropical or tropical moist montane forests and subtropical or tropical high-altitude shrubland.

Taxonomy
The rufous-webbed bush tyrant was formerly placed in the monotypic genus Polioxolmis. It was moved to Cnemarchus based on the results of genetic studies published in 2020.

References

rufous-webbed bush tyrant
Birds of the Puna grassland
rufous-webbed bush tyrant
rufous-webbed bush tyrant
Taxonomy articles created by Polbot
Taxobox binomials not recognized by IUCN